Garlington is a surname. It may refer to:

 Ernest Albert Garlington (1853–1934), United States Army general
 John Garlington (1946–2000), American football player
 Lee Garlington (born 1953), American television actress

Garlington is also a given name. It may refer to: 
 Garlington Jerome Sutton, known as G. J. Sutton (1909–1976), American politician